This page is an overview of the list of immovable heritage sites in Limburg (Belgium), alphabetically ordered by town name. This list is part of the immovable heritage of Belgium.

List of immovable heritage sites, in Alken, Belgium
List of immovable heritage sites, in As, Belgium
List of immovable heritage sites, in Beringen, Belgium
List of immovable heritage sites, in Bilzen
List of immovable heritage sites, in Bocholt, Belgium
List of immovable heritage sites, in Borgloon
List of immovable heritage sites, in Bree, Belgium
List of immovable heritage sites, in Diepenbeek
List of immovable heritage sites, in Dilsen-Stokkem
List of immovable heritage sites, in Genk
List of immovable heritage sites, in Gingelom
List of immovable heritage sites, in Halen
List of immovable heritage sites, in Ham, Belgium
List of immovable heritage sites, in Hamont-Achel
List of immovable heritage sites, in Hasselt
List of immovable heritage sites, in Hechtel-Eksel
List of immovable heritage sites, in Heers
List of immovable heritage sites, in Herk-de-Stad
List of immovable heritage sites, in Herstappe
List of immovable heritage sites, in Heusden-Zolder
List of immovable heritage sites, in Hoeselt
List of immovable heritage sites, in Houthalen-Helchteren

List of immovable heritage sites, in Kinrooi
List of immovable heritage sites, in Kortessem
List of immovable heritage sites, in Lanaken
List of immovable heritage sites, in Leopoldsburg
List of immovable heritage sites, in Lommel
List of immovable heritage sites, in Lummen
List of immovable heritage sites, in Maaseik
List of immovable heritage sites, in Maasmechelen
List of immovable heritage sites, in Meeuwen-Gruitrode
List of immovable heritage sites, in Neerpelt
List of immovable heritage sites, in Nieuwerkerken
List of immovable heritage sites, in Opglabbeek
List of immovable heritage sites, in Overpelt
List of immovable heritage sites, in Peer, Belgium
List of immovable heritage sites, in Riemst
List of immovable heritage sites, in Sint-Truiden
List of immovable heritage sites, in Tessenderlo
List of immovable heritage sites, in Tongeren
List of immovable heritage sites, in Voeren
List of immovable heritage sites, in Wellen
List of immovable heritage sites, in Zonhoven
List of immovable heritage sites, in Zutendaal

Lists of protected heritage sites in Flanders